Tapping the Vein is the fifth studio album by German thrash metal band Sodom, released on 1 August 1992 through Steamhammer/SPV. The album was recorded with producer Harris Johns at Dierks Studios in Cologne, Germany. The release marks the studio debut of guitarist Andy Brings and is the last album to feature original member Chris Witchhunter on drums. 

The album represents a return to a heavy and fast-paced musical direction, and features a notable death metal influence.

Tapping the Vein received positive reviews from critics, who noted the band's efforts in modernising their sound. The album peaked at number 56 on Germany's Official Top 100 Charts, and was promoted the album on a tour throughout Germany and Japan in 1992.

Track listing

Personnel

Sodom
Tom Angelripper - vocals, bass
Andy Brings - guitars
Chris Witchhunter - drums

Production
Dieter Braun - cover art
Jürgen Huber - cover art
Harris Johns - production, engineering, recording

Charts

References

1992 albums
Sodom (band) albums
SPV/Steamhammer albums
Albums produced by Harris Johns